Šemševo is a village in the municipality of Jegunovce, North Macedonia.

Demographics
As of the 2021 census, Šemševo had 1,532 residents with the following ethnic composition:
Albanians 1,393
Macedonians 116
Persons for whom data are taken from administrative sources 22
Others 1

According to the 2002 census, the village had a total of 1,737 inhabitants. Ethnic groups in the village include:

Albanians 1,616
Macedonians 35

Sports
Local football club KF Shemshova 1984 have played in the Macedonian Third League.

References

External links

Villages in Jegunovce Municipality
Albanian communities in North Macedonia